All's Fair is an American television sitcom from Norman Lear that aired one season  on CBS from 1976 to 1977. The series co-starred Richard Crenna as a conservative political columnist and Bernadette Peters as a liberal photographer, and their romantic mismatch because of age and political opinions. The program also featured  Michael Keaton in an early role as Lanny Wolf.  Peters was nominated for a Golden Globe Award for her role.

Plot
In Washington, D.C., an older (49) conservative columnist Richard C. Barrington (Richard Crenna) and a young (23) liberal photographer Charlotte (Charley) Drake (Bernadette Peters) become romantically involved.  The complications of their politics and the age difference provide the story lines. They are "separated by politics, generation gap, manners and living styles".

Barrington is a gourmet cook who lives in a luxurious Washington townhouse, and Drake is a vegetarian. Barrington has a girl friend, a literary agent (Salome Jens), when he first meets Drake. The style of the show is "almost constant hysteria, the rapid pacing set to the sounds of argumentative shouting."

Cast and crew
Cast

Source: Nostalgia Central

 Richard C. Barrington – Richard Crenna
 Charlotte (Charley) Drake – Bernadette Peters
 Lucy Daniels, Al's girlfriend and a reporter – Lee Chamberlin
 Allen Brooks, Richard's assistant – J.A. Preston
 Ginger Livingston, Charley's roommate – Judith Kahan
 Senator Wayne Joplin, a liberal Senator and friend of Richard – Jack Dodson
 Lanny Wolf (1976), aide to President Carter – Michael Keaton

Crew
 Norman Lear – Production Supervisor
 Michael Elias – Producer
 Rod Parker – Executive Producer
 Bob Claver – Director
 Hal Cooper – Director
 Bob Schiller – Writer and Producer
 Bob Weiskopf – Writer and Producer
 Ben Stein – Consultant and writer

Episodes

Reception
The reviewer for Knight News Wire wrote that the show "looks like the best new comedy series of the year...The show looks sound in both writing and acting ... the characters spend a lot of time shouting. Lear seems to have decided ... that high-decibel dialogue is necessary to hold the attention of a large audience."

The critic for The New York Times wrote that "The casting is first-rate and the finger-snapping pace of the show leaves just about everything looking easy and undemanding.

The reviewer for Copley News Service wrote that he did not believe in the relationship (between Crenna and Peters). However, he wrote that "it works. It works because Crenna is an expert farceur and Peters is, well, cute and full of the old ginger. It works because the dialogue has crackle and wit. ...  Peters has spunk and spirit and a bawdy and snappishly delightful wit ... a well-paced, intelligently conceived and altogether trenchant comedy and I don't see how it can miss."

Awards and nominations
Golden Globe, 1977, Best Performance by an Actress in a Television Series - Comedy or Musical - Bernadette Peters (nominated)

See also
The Powers That Be

References

External links
 
 
 

Television series by Sony Pictures Television
1970s American sitcoms
1976 American television series debuts
1977 American television series endings
CBS original programming
Television shows set in Washington, D.C.
English-language television shows
Television series created by Norman Lear